Daphne's Flight is a collaboration between five highly regarded female vocalists, instrumentalists, and songwriters in the British folk and root music scene: Christine Collister, Melanie Harrold, Julie Matthews, Helen Watson and Chris While. The collaboration resulted in a well-reviewed album and a sell-out tour during the mid-1990s. The project helped to cement relationships between the members, raised their individual profiles nationally and internationally and has been seen as marking a turning point in the role of women within the English folk movement. Twenty years after the initial collaboration, Daphne's Flight returned with a new studio album and a live release, and toured extensively.

History 
The group made their début at the 1995 Cambridge Folk Festival, where they were one of the hits of the event. This was followed by a major concert at London's prestigious Union Chapel in December. In January 1996 they recorded their eponymous album in ten days, fitted between busy schedules, in The Big Room, Kirk Michael, the Isle of Man. The studio had to be completed by builders working through the night. The result was very positively reviewed in the folk and roots music press and gained considerable mainstream press and media attention. The group followed the release with a popular major 18-date tour of England through May and June 1996.

The project proved a one-off for some time as the members pursued their own careers, but in subsequent years they appeared on and contributed to each other’s albums and live appearances. Partial reunions occurred for specific gigs, and in 2003 at the Prebendal Festival they reassembled for a reunion.

As the 20th anniversary of the initial collaboration approached, members of the group began talking of a full-fledged reunion project, which was eventually realized with the release of the critically acclaimed album Knows Time, Knows Change in 2017. The entire 2017 tour was recorded on digital multi-track, from which a third album, Daphne's Flight Live, was assembled and released in 2018.  The group continued touring during 2019 and into 2020.

Members and Contributions 
Christine Collister - vocals, guitar, percussion
Melanie Harrold - vocals, guitar, piano
Julie Matthews - vocals, guitar, piano, mandolin
Helen Watson, vocals, guitar, harmonica
Chris While - vocals, guitar, dulcimer, Banjo, Bodhran, Darbuka
Miranda Sykes - vocals, double bass, guitar

Recordings 
Daphne's Flight (1996)
 "Over and Over" (lead vocal: Melanie Harrold) (Written By M Harrold)
 "Ain't No Sunshine" (lead vocal: Christine Collister)
 "Another Year Another Day" (lead vocal: Chris While) (Written By C While)
 "The Calling" (lead vocal: Julie Matthews) (Written By J Matthews)
 "Gone" (lead vocal: Helen Watson) (Written By H Watson)
 "The Letter" (lead vocal: Melanie Harrold) (Written By M Harrold)
 "Father Adieu" (All)
 "Guilty" (lead vocal: Christine Collister)
 "Shake Out Your Silver" (lead vocal: Helen Watson) (Written By H Watson)
 "Circle Round The Sun" (lead vocal: Chris While) (Written By C While)
 "Rise Above The Tide Of Life" (lead vocal: Julie Matthews) (Written By J Matthews)

Knows Time, Knows Change (2017)
 "Lay Fallow" (Lead Vocal: Chris While)
 "How Glad I Am" (Lead Vocal: Helen Watson)
 "Goddess Of Man" (Lead Vocal: Christine Collister) (Written by C Collister & Lindsay Rowe)
 "Ship Building" (Lead Vocal: Melanie Harrold) 
 "Count Me In" (Lead Vocal: Julie Matthews) (Written By J Matthews)
 "Let My Ship Come Sail In" (Lead Vocal: Helen Watson) (Written By H Watson & Mark Creswell)
 "Heart Of Stone" (Lead Vocal: Chris While) (Written By C While)
 "No One Knows His Name" (Lead Vocal: Christine Collister) (Written by C Collister)
 "My Heart 2" (Lead Vocal: Melanie Harrold) (Written By M Harrold)
 "Split" (Lead Vocal: Julie Matthews) (Written By J Matthews)

Daphne's Flight Live (2018)
 Tree Of Life
 How Glad I Am
 No One Knows His Name
 Shipbuilding
 Split
 Over And Over
 Another Year Another Day
 Gone
 The Calling
 Guilty
 From The Heart
 Heart Of Stone
 Out Of Left Field
 Goddess Of Man
 Pride
 Father Adieu

References 

1996 albums